The Ireland Wolves cricket team toured Bangladesh in February and March 2021 to play an unofficial Test match (with First-class status), five unofficial One Day International matches (with List A status) and one unofficial Twenty20 International match (with Twenty20 status) against a Bangladesh Emerging team. The tour was confirmed a day after Ireland's tour of Zimbabwe was cancelled. The original tour schedule included two Twenty20 matches, but one was dropped from the itinerary on 13 March 2021.

The first unofficial ODI match was abandoned after 30 overs, after Ruhan Pretorius tested positive for COVID-19. Ahead of the second ODI, the Bangladesh Cricket Board (BCB) confirmed that the match would take place, after all players returned a negative test. Pretorius' test was later found to be a false positive, with him returning to the squad for the second match.

Squads

Originally, George Dockrell was set to captain the Ireland Wolves in the unofficial Test, and Harry Tector would lead the side in the limited overs matches. However, the day before the squad departed for Bangladesh, it was announced that Dockrell had opted out of the tour. The same day, Ruhan Pretorius was added to the squad and Tector was confirmed as captain.

Unofficial Test series

Only unofficial Test

Unofficial ODI series

1st unofficial ODI

2nd unofficial ODI

3rd unofficial ODI

4th unofficial ODI

5th unofficial ODI

Unofficial T20I series

Only unofficial T20I

See also 

 Netherlands A cricket team in Ireland in 2021

References

Notes

External links
 Series home at ESPN Cricinfo

2021 in Bangladeshi cricket
2021 in Irish cricket